"Please Don't Make Me Cry" is a song written and originally recorded by Winston Groovy in 1970.

UB40 version 

The most well-known recorded version of the song is by reggae group UB40, and was the follow-up single to their chart-topping cover of Neil Diamond's "Red Red Wine". Both singles were taken from the group's 1983 album Labour of Love.  The single peaked at number 10 on the singles chart in the UK, becoming their second consecutive Top 10 hit (sixth overall). It also appeared on the group's greatest hits album The Very Best of UB40 in 2000.

Charts

References 

UB40 songs
1970 songs
1983 singles
Reggae songs
A&M Records singles